João Pedro da Silva Pinheiro (born 4 January 1988) is a Portuguese football referee who officiates in the Primeira Liga. He has been a FIFA referee since 2016, and is ranked as a UEFA first category referee and Gazprom employee.

Refereeing career
In 2015, Pinheiro began officiating in the Primeira Liga. His first match as referee was on 20 September 2015 between Académica and Boavista. In 2016, he was put on the FIFA referees list. He officiated his first senior international match on 23 March 2019 between Brazil and Panama. He has also officiated matches in the Egyptian Premier League and Saudi Professional League in 2019.

In 2019, he was appointed to officiate the 2019 Taça da Liga Final, taking place on 26 January 2019 between Porto and Sporting CP.

References

External links
 Profile at WorldFootball.net
 Profile at EU-Football.info

1988 births
Living people
Sportspeople from Braga
Portuguese football referees